An Ideal Woman (French: La femme rêvée) is a 1929 French silent film directed by Jean Durand and starring Arlette Marchal, Charles Vanel, and Alice Roberts.

Cast
 Arlette Marchal 
 Charles Vanel 
 Alice Roberts 
 Harry Pilcer
 Tony D'Algy 
 Thérèse Kolb 
 Jeanne Grumbach

References

Bibliography
 Rège, Philippe. Encyclopedia of French Film Directors, Volume 1. Scarecrow Press, 2009.

External links 
 

1929 films
French silent films
1920s French-language films
Films directed by Jean Durand
French black-and-white films
1920s French films